Abir Goswami (21 April 1975 – 31 May 2013) was an Indian actor. He worked in television serials like Woh Rehne Waali Mehlon Ki, Pyaar Ka Dard Hai Meetha Meetha Pyaara Pyaara, etc.

Television

Movies
 Khakee as Photographer
 Lakshya as Capt. Sudhir Mishra
 The Legend of Bhagat Singh as Phanindra Ghosh
 Sakkhat - a Bengali movie
 Bidhatar Lekha - a Bengali movie
 Ugly
 Rocky as an undercover police officer (Bengali Movie)
 Darna Mana Hai
 Ratparir Rupkatha - a Bengali movie
 Banobhumi - a Bengali movie

Death
Goswami died on 31 May 2013 at the age of 38 due to cardiac arrest on a treadmill.

References

External links

2013 deaths
Indian male television actors
1975 births
Bengali male actors
Place of birth missing
Actors from Mumbai